Blind John Davis (December 7, 1913 – October 12, 1985) was an American blues and boogie-woogie pianist and singer. He is best remembered for his recordings, including "A Little Every Day" and "Everybody's Boogie".

Biography
Davis was born in Hattiesburg, Mississippi, and relocated with his family to Chicago at the age of two. Seven years later, he had lost his sight. In his early years Davis backed Merline Johnson, and by his mid-twenties he was a well-known and reliable accompanying pianist. Between 1937 and 1942, he recorded with Big Bill Broonzy, Sonny Boy Williamson I, Tampa Red, Red Nelson, Merline Johnson, and others. He also made several records of his own, singing in his lightweight voice.

Having played in various recording sessions with Lonnie Johnson, Davis teamed up with him in the 1940s. He recorded later on his own. His "No Mail Today" (1949) was a minor hit. Most of Doctor Clayton's later recordings featured Davis on piano.

He toured Europe with Broonzy in 1952, the first blues pianist to do so. In later years Davis toured and recorded frequently in Europe, where he enjoyed a higher profile than in the United States.

House Fire
In 1955, Davis's house in Chicago burned down. His wife died in the fire, and his collection of 1700 78-rpm records, some of them unissued, was destroyed.

Death
Davis died in Chicago in October 1985, at the age of 71.

Discography
The Incomparable Blind John Davis (1974), Oldie Blues OL 2803
Alive "Live" and Well (1976), Chrischaa
Heavy Timbre: Chicago Boogie Piano (1976, re-released 2002), Sirens Records
Stompin' on a Saturday Night (1978), Alligator
You Better Cut That Out (1985), Red Beans
Blind John Davis [Story of Blues] (1991), Story of Blues

See also
List of boogie woogie musicians
List of Chicago blues musicians
Piano blues

References

External links
 Blind John Davis at Discogs

1913 births
1985 deaths
American blues pianists
American male pianists
American blues singers
Blind musicians
Blues musicians from Mississippi
Boogie-woogie pianists
Chicago blues musicians
Musicians from Hattiesburg, Mississippi
Oldie Blues artists
20th-century American singers
20th-century American pianists
20th-century American male singers